La Grande is the third studio album by American musician Laura Gibson. It was released on January 24, 2012 under Barsuk Records. Gibson wrote the album after spending time in the city of La Grande, Oregon, which served as a basis for the majority of its songs. The album's title track was given a music video released in February 2012.

Release
La Grande was released as a joint release by Barsuk, City Slang, and Jealous Butcher Records.

Reception
The album received generally positive reviews from music critics, with a 79% rating on Metacritic, an online review aggregator. James Skinner of  BBC gave the album a positive review, writing: "This gem of a long-player – both sleepy and steely, mystical yet rooted in very real and universal themes – deserves all the plaudits that will hopefully meet its release." Pitchfork also gave the album a positive review, rating it 7.4 out of 10, and writing: "One wouldn't expect Gibson's latest to bowl over any audiophile chasing the wow!-factor, but for the patient, contemplative listener, La Grande-- much like the campfire depicted on its cover-- is a record worth warming to."

Track listing

References

2012 albums
Barsuk Records albums
Laura Gibson albums